Sarolta Stieber (23 May 1905 – 1985) was a Hungarian swimmer. She competed in the women's 100 metre freestyle event at the 1928 Summer Olympics.

References

1905 births
1985 deaths
Hungarian female swimmers
Olympic swimmers of Hungary
Swimmers at the 1928 Summer Olympics
Hungarian female freestyle swimmers
20th-century Hungarian women